Keynan Anthony Middleton (born September 12, 1993) is an American professional baseball pitcher in the Chicago White Sox organization. He was drafted by the Los Angeles Angels in the third round of the 2013 MLB draft. Middleton made his MLB debut with the Angels in 2017, and has also played in Major League Baseball (MLB) for the Seattle Mariners.

High school and college
Middleton attended Milwaukie High School in Milwaukie, Oregon. He then played college baseball at Lane Community College. He was drafted by the Los Angeles Angels in the third round (95th overall) of the 2013 Major League Baseball draft.

Career

Los Angeles Angels
He made his professional debut with the Arizona League Angels and was promoted to the Orem Owlz during the season. Middleton spent 2014 with Orem and 2015 with the Burlington Bees. He started 2016 with the Inland Empire 66ers and was promoted to the Arkansas Travelers and Salt Lake Bees during the season. Between the three teams he was 1–2 with a 3.41 ERA, and averaged 12.0 strikeouts per 9 innings.

Middleton made his MLB debut on May 5, 2017, allowing a run while striking out one in an inning of work. On June 11, Middleton earned his first career win in an inning of relief against the Houston Astros. Middleton picked up his first career save on August 8, 2017, in a 3–2 victory over Baltimore. After striking out the first two batters he faced, Middleton yielded a solo home run to Baltimore catcher Caleb Joseph and then got outfielder Joey Rickard to pop out on the infield to end the game. He finished the season with a 6–1 record and 3 saves in 64 games, as he averaged 9.7 strikeouts per 9 innings.  His 64 appearances were third-most-ever by an Angels rookie, and he led AL rookies with an average fastball velocity of 97.2 miles per hour.

He began the 2018 season as the Angels closer. On May 14, Middleton was placed on the disabled list for the second time in the year due to suspected damage to the UCL in his right elbow. On May 17, it was announced that Middleton would undergo Tommy John surgery, ending his season. He finished 0–0 with six saves in 16 appearances and a 2.04 ERA and 16 strikeouts in  innings. After rehabbing for the majority of the 2019 season, Middleton made his return in September, appearing in 11 games. On December 2, Middleton was nontendered by the Angels.

In 2020 he was 0–1 with a 5.25 ERA.

Seattle Mariners
On December 16, 2020, Middleton signed an $800K major league contract with the Seattle Mariners. Middleton appeared in 32 games for the Mariners, posting a 4.94 ERA with 24 strikeouts. On August 26, 2021, Middleton was designated for assignment by the Mariners. On August 28, Middleton cleared waivers and was assigned outright to the Triple-A Tacoma Rainers. On October 8, Middleton elected free agency.

Arizona Diamondbacks
On January 13, 2022, Middleton signed a minor league contract with the Arizona Diamondbacks. He was assigned to the Triple-A Reno Aces to begin the year.

On April 29, Middleton had his contract selected to the 40-man and active rosters. He was outrighted off the roster on November 3, 2022, then subsequently elected free agency.

Chicago White Sox
On January 15, 2023, Middleton signed a minor league contract with the Chicago White Sox.

References

External links

1993 births
Living people
African-American baseball players
Sportspeople from Milwaukie, Oregon
Baseball players from Portland, Oregon
Major League Baseball pitchers
Los Angeles Angels players
Seattle Mariners players
Arizona Diamondbacks players
Arizona League Angels players
Orem Owlz players
Burlington Bees players
Inland Empire 66ers of San Bernardino players
Arkansas Travelers players
Salt Lake Bees players
Tacoma Rainiers players
Reno Aces players
Lane Titans baseball players
21st-century African-American sportspeople